The Bomun Lake Resort (or Bomun Tourist Complex) is a large tourist complex around Bomun Lake in the city of Gyeongju, South Korea. The resort covers the districts of Bomun-dong, Sinpyeong-dong, Amgok-dong and Cheongun-dong. It is situated under the ruin of the old fortress on Myeonghwal mountain, 6.5 km east of the central Gyeongju and faces Toham mountain. It provides lodging, eatery, recreation and sports facilities in the city. Although the resort was originally established to attract foreign visitors, as the domestic income and desire for tourism were increased since the late 1980s, it gained a tremendous popularity from domestic visitors. As a result, from onward, various facilities have been built for domestic visitors.

History 
In August 1971, the government concluded the Gyeongju tourism development plan, started in 1974, opened the Bomun Gwangwang complex in 1975, and completed the entire 2.1 million pyeong tourism development project in January 1979.

Gallery

See also
Tourism in Gyeongju

References

Buildings and structures in Gyeongju
Resorts in South Korea
Tourist attractions in Gyeongju